Veer Birsa Dal was an Adivasi political party in Bihar, India. It was one of several splinter groups that appeared 1967–1972, after the Jharkhand Party had merged into the Indian National Congress.

References

Defunct political parties in Bihar
Political parties with year of establishment missing
Political parties with year of disestablishment missing